Inkollu is a small town located in the Bapatla district of the Indian state of Andhra Pradesh. It serves as the seat of Inkollu Mandal, an administrative district and is part of the chirala revenue division of Bapatla district.The nearest Cities are Chirala,Bapatla,Guntur,Ongole,Addanki and chilakaliripeta.

The native language of Inkollu is Telugu.Few people speak Telugu mixed Urdu.

Etymology 
Inkollu was previously known as Inkina Kolanu, means "sinking of ponds" . .However no conclusive literary evidance for The name.

Geography 

Inkollu is located in the Inkollu Mandal. Inkollu is the sub-district headquarters of Inkollu Mandal. As per 2009 statistics, Inkollu village is also a Major Gram Panchayat.

Inkollu lies near the southeastern coast of India and is approximately 100 kilometres from the state capital of Amaravati.

Nearby villages include Koniki (located 4.8 kilometres away), Sudivaripalem (located 8.2 kilometres away), Nagandla (located 8.5 kilometres away), Idupulapadu (located 9.1 kilometres away), and Duddukuru.

Hyderabad, Chennai, Nellore, Tirupathi, Ongole, Guntur and Vijayawada are nearby cities.

Inkollu is located around 45  kilometers away from its district headquarters in Bapatla. The other nearest district headquarters are Ongole situated 39 kilometers and Guntur situated 60 kilometers away from Inkollu.

The surrounding districts are Guntur, Krishna, West Godavari and Nellore

Inkollu's nearest beach is Ramapuram (Chirala) located 30 kilometres away. Other beaches include: Chirala Beach, Bapatla Beach.
Inkollu Cheruvu (Nagula Cheruvu)is a large pond in the northwest quadrant.

Climate 
The area sees hot and humid summers and cool winters due to its proximity to the coast of Bay of Bengal. It receives both South west and North-east monsoon.

Demographics 
According to the 2011 Census of India the population was 17,581 living in about 4,935 houses. The total area is 3365 hectares.

Towns and Villages in Inkollu Mandalam:

Economy 
Business is one of the main occupations of people in the town. People who dwells in Inkollu depend on farming as well. Cultivation is one of the main occupations in Inkollu. The Pavulur Anjenayaswamy temple is very famous and is located between the border of rural village Pavulur which is around 3 kilometres away from Inkollu. The Town Has many Old temples like Chenna kesava Swami temple(Vishnalayam),Sivalayam,Veerabhadra Swami temple,padmala ankamma temple. The NSL textile mill employs around 5,000 people, and most of the residents depend on its business.The Town has many cold storages.The town has Two cinema Halls and two popular Hospitals.

Transport 
The main source of transport in Inkollu is Road Transport. People prefer the APSRTC buses mostly. The towns within 40 kilometres of Inkollu are Ongole, Chirala, Addanki, Parchur, Martur. The nearest railway stations are Vetapalem (located 10 kilometres away), Chirala (located 23 kilometres away) and Ongole (located 45 kilometres).

Education 
Primary and secondary school education are provided or aided by the government, or are private. The languages used in schools are English and Telugu.

 Elementary School
 NR&VSR Girls High School
 Boys High School
 Nivedita English Medium School
 MRR Public School
 Adarsa Public School
 Gowthami Public school
 Universal Techno School
 Vikas Public School
 JVP School
 Adrasa High school
 Zilla Parishad High school 
 Bhashyam High school
 Sai Rama School
 Aakridge High School

Colleges 

 DCRM Degree & PG college, Pharmacy
 Surya Intermediate College
 ITI College

References 
Prakasam District Mandal

Villages in Prakasam district
Mandal headquarters in Prakasam district